Bronx SIU is an American television series on the Urban Movie Channel that focuses on an elite task force, based out of The Bronx, that handles New York City's most demanding and difficult cases. The show premiered in 2018 and was then renewed for a second season.  Bronx SIU follows the pursuits of Jimmy Blue, a homicide detective who suffers from post traumatic stress disorder.  After a string of homicides, Jimmy is commissioned to head up a team of investigators tasked with solving only the most heinous crimes.  In 2019, Bronx SIU received three Daytime Emmy nominations.  In 2020, Bronx SIU also received three Daytime Emmy nominations.

Cast
 Brian J. White as Jimmy Blue
 Shanti Lowry as Yolanda Rodriguez

References

External links

 

2018 American television series debuts
Television shows set in the Bronx
Urban Movie Channel original programming
Fictional portrayals of police departments in the United States
The Bronx in fiction